Cambuslang Football Club was a Scottish football club, based in the Cambuslang area (Greater Glasgow). Cambuslang was one of the founding members of the Scottish Football League, but left the league after just two seasons.

History

The club was founded in 1874. The new football club was named Excelsior with a pitch being laid out in Cambuslang Public Park, known locally as Bogshole Park.

The new club were challenged by the lads  from the village of Halfway to play for the right to call themselves Cambuslang, so the Excelsior team went to Halfway and in their first match at Clyde Street Park won by the scoreline of 6–0; from then on the Excelsior name was scratched and Cambuslang Football and Athletic Club were formed.

In 1879 at a meeting at the Cross Hotel in Hamilton the secretary of Cambuslang was joined by those of Airdrie, Airdriehill, Drumpellier, Hamilton Academical, Glengowan, Clydebank, Uddingston, West Benhar, Benhar and Stonelaw where it was agreed that each club would pay 10 shillings (50p) towards a county cup and the new district would be known as the Lanarkshire County Football Association. Cambuslang would win the Lanarkshire Cup on two occasions and be runners up four times before falling out with the Lanarkshire Football Association and joining the Glasgow Football Association for the 1887–88 season.

The club officially left the Lanarkshire Association, while Mr Park a club board member, also stepped down as the Association president, in March 1887.

They reached the Scottish Cup Final in 1888, having beaten Abercorn 10–1 in a semi-final replay after a 1–1 draw with a goal from Billy Mortimer, but lost the final 6–1 to Renton in what remains the joint-largest margin in the competition's history (matched in 1972).  The two clubs also met in the final of the Glasgow Charity Cup three months later, Renton winning 4–0.  In between, however, Cambuslang had the consolation of winning the inaugural Glasgow Cup, beating Rangers 3–1 in the final in front of 12,000 at Hampden Park.

Cambuslang joined the Scottish Football League at its inauguration in 1890 and finished fourth in the 1890–91 season. The club finished last in the eleven team league in 1891–92, however, and did not seek re-election to the League. They made no effort to re-join the League when it added a Second Division.

Cambuslang's demise came at the end of the 1896–97 season, playing in the Scottish Alliance League.

The Junior team Cambuslang Rangers have nothing whatsoever to do with the former defunct club but they shared the ground for the first year in 1896–97 before moving on. They were called Cambuslang Rovers from 1896–1899 before changing to Rangers in 1899 (they were a  merger of three local Junior teams), the other junior side was Cambuslang Hibernian who were formed in 1884 and used Bogshole, later renamed Mains Park.

Stadium 
1874–1876 Bogshole
1876–1888 Westburn Green/Westburn Park
1888–1897 Whitefield Park

Colours 
The club played in dark blue, with varying amounts of white (shorts in 1874, shorts and socks from 1879 to 1886, and shorts again from 1893 to the club's end).    The club's change kit was white shirts.

Honours 
Scottish Cup: Runners-up 1887–88
Lanarkshire Cup: 1884, 1885
Glasgow Cup: 1888
Glasgow Charity Cup: runners-up 1888

See also
:Category:Cambuslang F.C. players

References

Sources 
 

 
Cambuslang
Defunct football clubs in Scotland
Football in South Lanarkshire
Scottish Football League teams
Association football clubs established in 1874
Association football clubs disestablished in 1897
Scottish Football League founder members
1874 establishments in Scotland
1897 disestablishments in Scotland